Katarzyna Paprocka (died 1638) was a Polish woman who was accused of sorcery.

She was prosecuted for witchcraft in Bydgoszcz, accused of having caused the death of her first spouse in order to marry her second. She died in prison before she could be executed.

The case against her was subject of the novel Czarownice z Pomorza i Kujawy by Anna Koprowska-Głowacka.

References

 Małgorzata Pilaszek: Procesy o czary w Polsce w wiekach XV–XVIII. Kraków: 2008

17th-century Polish people
17th-century Polish women
Witch trials in Poland
People accused of witchcraft
1639 deaths